Tatyana Valeryevna Sibiliova (born 17 May 1980 in Chelyabinsk) is a female race walker from Russia.

She won the 2012 Memorial Mario Albisetti in Lugano.

Achievements

References

External links

 

1980 births
Living people
Russian female racewalkers
Athletes (track and field) at the 2008 Summer Olympics
Olympic athletes of Russia
Sportspeople from Chelyabinsk
Universiade medalists in athletics (track and field)
Universiade gold medalists for Russia
Universiade bronze medalists for Russia
Medalists at the 2003 Summer Universiade
Medalists at the 2005 Summer Universiade
21st-century Russian women